The 2005 Stanford Cardinal football team represented Stanford University in the 2005 NCAA Division I FBS football season. The team was led by first-year head coach Walt Harris, replacing fired coach Buddy Teevens.  The team played their home games at Stanford Stadium in Stanford, California and competed in the Pacific-10 Conference.

Schedule

Coaching staff

Walt Harris – Head coach and offensive coordinator
Wayne Moses – Running back
Tucker Waugh – Wide receivers
Tom Freeman – Offensive line (center and guards) and run game coordinator
John McDonell – Offensive (tackle) and tight end
Tom Hayes – Defensive coordinator and defensive backs
Dave Tipton – Defensive line
Darrell Patterson – Inside linebackers
Tom Quinn – Outside linebackers and special teams coordinator
Nathaniel Hackett – Specialist and recruiting coordinator

References

Stanford
Stanford Cardinal football seasons
Stanford Cardinal football